Yihye or  Yihyeh is a Hebrew given name. A variant is Yihyah. Notable people with the name include:

Yihye Bashiri (died c. 1661), Yemenite Rabbi
Yihye Haybi (1911–1977), Yemenite photographer

See also
Yahya (name)

Hebrew-language given names